The 2016 BMW PGA Championship is the 62nd edition of the BMW PGA Championship, an annual golf tournament on the European Tour, held 26–29 May at the West Course of Wentworth Club in Virginia Water, Surrey, England, a suburb southwest of London.

Chris Wood won by one stroke over Rikard Karlberg.

Course layout

Field

Past champions in the field

Made the cut

Missed the cut

Nationalities in the field

Round summaries

First round
Thursday, 26 May 2016

Second round
Friday, 27 May 2016

Third round
Saturday, 28 May 2016

Final round
Sunday, 29 May 2016

References

External links
Coverage on European Tour official site
Wentworth Club: Golf

BMW PGA Championship
Golf tournaments in England
BMW PGA Championship
BMW PGA Championship
BMW PGA Championship